In United States local government, a consolidated city-county is formed when one or more cities and their surrounding county (parish in Louisiana, borough in Alaska) merge into one unified jurisdiction. As such it has the governmental powers of both a municipal corporation and an administrative division of a state.

A consolidated city-county is different from an independent city, although the latter may result from consolidation of a city and a county and may also have the same powers as a consolidated city-county. An independent city is a city not deemed by its state to be located within the boundary of any county and considered a primary administrative division of its state. A consolidated city-county differs from an independent city in that the city and county both nominally exist, although they have a consolidated government, whereas in an independent city, the county does not even nominally exist. Furthermore, a consolidated city-county may still contain independent municipalities maintaining some governmental powers that did not merge with the rest of the county.

Not considering Hawaii, which has no independent municipalities, the Midwest and Upper South have the highest concentration of large consolidated city-county governments in the United States, including Indianapolis, Indiana; Nashville, Tennessee; Louisville, Kentucky; Kansas City, Kansas; and Lexington, Kentucky. Currently, the largest consolidated city-county in the United States by population is Philadelphia, Pennsylvania, while the largest by land area is Sitka, Alaska.

Overview
Consolidated city-counties are typically formed to address particular government challenges. Among the benefits of having a unified jurisdiction include potential cost savings, more efficiency, increased legal powers and revenue sources, and a more streamlined planning system.

Most consolidated city-counties have a single chief executive who acts as both the city mayor and as the head of the county government, and a multi-district elected body that serves as both the city council and as the county legislative body.

In many states, consolidated city-counties must be approved by voters. According to information compiled by former Albuquerque mayor David Rusk, 105 referendums were held in the United States between 1902 and 2010 to consider proposals to consolidate cities and counties. Only 27 of these proposals were approved by voters.

Wyandotte County, Kansas, uses the term "unified government" to refer to its consolidation with Kansas City, Kansas, and most of the towns within the county boundaries remain separate jurisdictions within the county. Individual sections of a metropolitan or regional municipality may retain some autonomous jurisdiction apart from the citywide government.

Often, in place of another level of government, local governments form councils of governments – essentially governmental organizations which are not empowered with any law-making or law enforcement powers. This is the case in the Atlanta metropolitan area, where the Atlanta Regional Commission (ARC) studies and makes recommendations on the impact of all major construction and development projects on the region, but generally cannot stop them. The Georgia Regional Transportation Authority (GRTA) is a true government agency of the state of Georgia, and does control some state transportation funding to the cities and counties, but otherwise has very little authority beyond this small power of the purse.

The case of New York City is unique, in that the city consists of five boroughs, each of which is co-extensive with a county. Each has its own district attorney; however, county-level government is essentially non-existent as all executive and legislative power is exercised by the city government throughout the five boroughs. The city, as currently constituted, was created in 1898 when the city of New York (then comprising what would become the boroughs of Manhattan and The Bronx) annexed Kings County, Queens County, and Richmond County as the boroughs of Brooklyn, Queens, and Staten Island, respectively.

Similar arrangements also exist in other countries. England has six "metropolitan counties" created in 1974: Greater Manchester, Merseyside, South Yorkshire, Tyne and Wear, West Midlands, and West Yorkshire. From 1986, these metropolitan counties do not have county councils but rather joint boards for certain functions. Modern unitary authorities are similar, and are known as county boroughs in Wales. In Scotland, Aberdeen, Dundee, Edinburgh and Glasgow are functionally "independent cities", though the term is not used. London is unique however, being a ceremonial county (officially known as Greater London) containing the 32 London boroughs. Enclaved within Greater London, the ancient City of London forms a distinct county, which today forms only a tiny part of what most consider to be London as a capital city, which takes up 607 square miles.

The Canadian province of Ontario contains several single-tier municipalities, which serve the same sort of functions as American consolidated city-counties. One example is the City of Toronto, created in 1998 from the amalgamation of the central government and the six constituent municipalities of the Municipality of Metropolitan Toronto (a type of regional municipality), itself originally created in 1954.

In Germany, Berlin and Hamburg are both cities and states (the state of Bremen consists of the cities of Bremen and Bremerhaven). Nearly every larger city in Germany is an independent city, like Frankfurt, Stuttgart, Munich or Dresden; Austria, where the capital of Vienna is both a city and state; France, where the capital city of Paris has been coterminous with the département of Paris since 1968; and South Korea, where Seoul is a special city, while six other cities (Busan, Daegu, Daejeon, Gwangju, Incheon, and Ulsan) are metropolitan cities. Additionally, the Australian Capital Territory government in Australia performs all municipal functions of the city of Canberra, and thus functions as an integrated city-territory. Similarly, the City of Tokyo merged with the prefecture to form Tokyo metropolis in 1943.

Balances
In nine consolidated city-county governments in the United States, the formerly independent incorporated places maintain some governmental powers. In these cities, which the United States Census Bureau calls "consolidated cities", statistics are recorded both for the entire consolidated government and for the component municipalities. A part of the consolidated government is called the "balance", which the Census Bureau defines as "the consolidated city minus the semi-independent incorporated places located within the consolidated city".

These consolidated cities are:
 Athens–Clarke County, Georgia
 Augusta–Richmond County, Georgia
 Butte–Silver Bow County, Montana
 Indianapolis–Marion County, Indiana
 Jacksonville–Duval County, Florida
 Kansas City, Kansas–Wyandotte County, Kansas
 Louisville–Jefferson County, Kentucky
 Macon–Bibb County, Georgia
 Nashville–Davidson County, Tennessee

List of consolidated city-counties

Consolidated since their creation
 Municipality of Anchorage, Alaska (City and Borough are consolidated forming a unified government)
 City and County of Broomfield, Colorado (Town of Broomfield incorporated June 1, 1961. Consolidated City and County of Broomfield created November 15, 2001, from the incorporated City of Broomfield in portions of Boulder, Adams, Jefferson, and Weld Counties.)
 City and County of Denver, Colorado (Denver City, Colorado Territory, incorporated November 7, 1861. Denver served as the Arapahoe County seat until November 15, 1902, when Arapahoe County was split into the new Adams County and the renamed South Arapahoe County.  Denver was split from the two new counties on December 1, 1902.)
 City and County of Honolulu, Hawaii
 City and Borough of Juneau, Alaska
 Menominee, Wisconsin, a town coterminous with Menominee County, Wisconsin
 Town and County of Nantucket, Massachusetts (one and the same since it was separated from Dukes County, New York to join the colony of Massachusetts). In New England a town serves the same municipal functions as a city. Contrary to city–county consolidation, eight of Massachusetts' 14 county governments have been abolished.
 City of New Orleans and Orleans Parish, Louisiana (The City of New Orleans has always served as Orleans Parish's government, though they initially were not coterminous. The city and parish have also annexed parts of neighboring Jefferson Parish.)
 City and County of San Francisco, California (The City of San Francisco was the seat of San Francisco County until 1856, when the county was split into the consolidated City and County of San Francisco in the north, with the remainder of old San Francisco County becoming the new County of San Mateo.)
 City and Borough of Sitka, Alaska
 City and Borough of Yakutat, Alaska
City and Borough of Wrangell, Alaska
Municipality and Borough of Skagway, Alaska

Merged
 Anaconda and Deer Lodge County, Montana
 Butte and Silver Bow County, Montana
 Columbus and Muscogee County, Georgia
 Cusseta and Chattahoochee County, Georgia
 Georgetown and Quitman County, Georgia
 Haines and Haines Borough, Alaska
 Hartsville and Trousdale County, Tennessee (Despite the consolidated city-county government, Hartsville is not coterminous with Trousdale County; Hartsville remains a geographically distinct municipality within the county.) 
 Houma and Terrebonne Parish, Louisiana (Despite the consolidated city-parish government, Houma is not coterminous with Terrebonne Parish; Houma remains a geographically distinct municipality within the parish.) 
 Lexington and Fayette County, Kentucky
 Los Alamos and Los Alamos County, New Mexico Town of Los Alamos consolidated with county of the same name in 1969 
 Lynchburg and Moore County, Tennessee
 Macon (and Payne) with Bibb County, Georgia
 Philadelphia and Philadelphia County, Pennsylvania – Their borders have been conterminous since 1854 Act of Consolidation, and the government structures were consolidated in 1952. The county still exists as a separate entity within Pennsylvania, but the functions of the county are generally administered by the city.
 Preston and Webster County, Georgia
 Statenville and Echols County, Georgia

Other
 New York City is coextensive with an amalgamation of five counties. Each county is coextensive with a borough of New York City:
 New York County (Borough of Manhattan)
 Bronx County (Borough of the Bronx)
 Kings County (Borough of Brooklyn)
 Richmond County (Borough of Staten Island)
 Queens County (Borough of Queens)
 Washington, D.C. – While the District of Columbia is a federal district and not a county, the city has had a consolidated municipal government since 1871. Prior to then, Washington, Georgetown, and the unincorporated County of Washington were separate jurisdictions within the District of Columbia. Prior to 1846, when it was retroceded to Virginia, the south bank of the District of Columbia was the County of Alexandria (now the independent City of Alexandria and the County of Arlington).

Merged with some independent municipalities
 Athens and Clarke County, Georgia (the cities of Winterville, which is entirely within Clarke County, and Bogart, which is partially within the county, retain  separate governments)
 Augusta and Richmond County, Georgia (two communities within Richmond County retain separate governments)
 Baton Rouge and East Baton Rouge Parish, Louisiana (three communities within East Baton Rouge Parish – Baker, Central and Zachary – retain separate governments. In addition, the City of Baton Rouge retains separate city limits, and its official census population only includes this area)
 Camden County, North Carolina (county with no incorporated municipalities, apart from a small portion of Elizabeth City, re-organizing into a single unified government)
 Indianapolis and Marion County, Indiana (four communities within Marion County retain separate governments: see Unigov)
 Jacksonville and Duval County, Florida (four incorporated places within Duval County – the cities of Jacksonville Beach, Neptune Beach, and Atlantic Beach and the town of Baldwin – retain separate governments; all other rural land is incorporated by Jacksonville and so the entire county is incorporated)
 Kansas City and Wyandotte County, Kansas (this "Unified Government" contains Kansas City, Edwardsville, most of Bonner Springs, and roughly half of Lake Quivira; a county relationship is maintained with the rest of the communities within the county) as of 1997.
 Lafayette, Louisiana and Lafayette Parish (In December 2018 voters amended the city-parish charter to split what was a single consolidated city-parish council into two councils — one to represent only the city of Lafayette and the other to represent the parish. The impetus for the change was the desire of city voters to take more control of city-related matters and general unease with the consequences of consolidation).
 Louisville and Jefferson County, Kentucky (all cities in pre-merger Jefferson County, other than Louisville, retain separate identities and some governmental functions, but all participate fully in the county-wide governing body, Louisville Metro Council)
 Nashville and Davidson County, Tennessee (six communities within Davidson County retain separate governments, although all participate in the metropolitan government in a two-tier system)
 Petersburg Borough, Alaska (When the borough was created in 2013, the city of Petersburg was dissolved. However, the city of Kupreanof remains a separate entity within the borough.)
 Tribune, Kansas and Greeley County, Kansas (Horace retaining a separate government)

Five cities in the Hampton Roads region of Virginia were formed by the consolidation of a city with a county: Chesapeake, Hampton, Newport News, Suffolk, and Virginia Beach (from Norfolk, Elizabeth City, Warwick, Nansemond, and Princess Anne counties, respectively). However, in each case an independent city was created and as such they are not consolidated city-counties. Instead, the Code of Virginia uses the term "consolidated city." Similarly, Carson City was consolidated with Ormsby County, Nevada in 1969, but the county was simultaneously dissolved. The city is now a municipality independent of any county.

Potentially consolidated
 Aurora, Colorado, split between three counties, explored the creation of a new consolidated city-county in 1996; the effort subsequently failed in a referendum. However, five years later nearby Broomfield was successful in creating a new city-county from portions of the four counties it had been a part of. Encouraged by Broomfield's experience, an Aurora city councilman again proposed consolidation in 2006. This was not accomplished in 2006 or 2007, and no bills to accomplish consolidation were introduced in the 2008 session of the Colorado legislature.
 A proposal was made to merge Johnson County, Kansas and Wyandotte County, Kansas and the cities located in those two into a single consolidated city-county, with the name to be determined.
 In 2005, The Plain Dealer in Cleveland, Ohio published a series of articles exploring the possibility of the city's merging with Cuyahoga County.
 Miami-Dade County, Florida operates under a federated two-tier government, where the county government operates as a superseding entity of county affairs and lower-tier incorporated municipalities operate civil and community services at the city level. However, the county provides city-level police, fire-rescue, sanitation, and other services under contract to many of the municipalities within its borders.
 The independent City of St. Louis, Missouri and that of St. Louis County. The city of St. Louis seceded from St. Louis County in the 1870s and is not part of any county in the state of Missouri. Regional leaders have since proposed several plans to reunify the City and County, each one rejected by voters.

Considered consolidation
 Albuquerque and Bernalillo County, New Mexico (1959, 2003)
 Baltimore and Baltimore County, Maryland: Baltimore is established in the Constitution of Maryland as an independent city. A proposed constitutional amendment to dissolve the city and merge it into Baltimore County was introduced in 1999 but was withdrawn less than a month after the first reading.
 Birmingham and Jefferson County, Alabama (1948)
Brunswick and Glynn County, Georgia (1969, 1987)
 Buffalo and Erie County, New York
 Charleston/North Charleston/Mount Pleasant and Charleston County, South Carolina (1974)
 Charlotte and Mecklenburg County, North Carolina (1971)
 Des Moines and Polk County, Iowa (1994, 2004)
 Durham and Durham County, North Carolina (1961, 1974)
 El Paso and El Paso County, Texas
 Evansville and Vanderburgh County, Indiana
 Voted four times on consolidation—in 1959, 1974, 2002, and 2012. The most recent vote saw consolidation defeated by a nearly 2-to-1 margin.
 Fairbanks and Fairbanks North Star Borough, Alaska (2001)
 Fayetteville and Lincoln County, Tennessee (2008)
 Fort Wayne and Allen County, Indiana
 Frankfort and Franklin County, Kentucky
 Gainesville and Alachua County, Florida (1990)
 Knoxville and Knox County, Tennessee (1959, 1978, 1996)
 Las Vegas and Clark County, Nevada
 Little Rock and Pulaski County, Arkansas
 Memphis and Shelby County, Tennessee (1962, 1971, 2010)
 Muncie and Delaware County, Indiana
 Oakland and Alameda County, California (1921)
 Omaha and Douglas County, Nebraska (2006, 2011)
 Movements to consolidate these two jurisdictions has been popping up since the decade of the 1900s. The 2006 proposal was approved by the Douglas County Board of Commissioners, but unanimously rejected by the Omaha City Council. The 2011 proposal was introduced by a state legislator in The Unicameral, as LB344; it was tabled in committee.
 Owensboro, Kentucky and Daviess County, Kentucky (1990)
 Orlando and Orange County, Florida
 Paducah and McCracken County, Kentucky
 Rejected a proposed consolidation in 2012 by a more than 2-to-1 margin.
 Pensacola and Escambia County, Florida (1970)
 Pittsburgh and Allegheny County, Pennsylvania
 passed referendums in 1925, 1929 and 1939 that were blocked by technicalities by the state assembly. A partial consolidation of area school districts in 1956. Currently has a task-force researching consolidation since 2005.
 Portland and Multnomah County, Oregon (1927, 1974)
 Richmond (independent city) with Henrico County, Virginia (1961), although the result would be an expanded independent city of Richmond rather than a consolidated city-county.
 Roanoke County, Virginia and the City of Roanoke, although the result would be an expanded independent city of Roanoke rather than a consolidated city-county
 held referendums in 1969 and 1990 to consolidate the two governments. Both times, city voters approved consolidation while county voters were opposed. The independent city of Salem, Virginia, which would have been surrounded by the consolidated entity, did not participate in the referendums. Vinton, Virginia would have retained its status as a town in the 1990 referendum. The consolidation issue has been dormant since 1990.
 Sacramento and Sacramento County, California (1974, 1990)
 Savannah and Chatham County, Georgia
 Prior consolidation referendum held in 1973 failed. The Georgia General Assembly is conducting a feasibility study towards consolidating the city of Savannah with Chatham County.
 St. Louis (independent city) with St. Louis County, Missouri (1926, 1962, In consideration in 2017)
 Sioux Falls and Minnehaha/Lincoln counties, South Dakota (2005)
 Spokane and Spokane County, Washington (1995)
 Tallahassee and Leon County, Florida (1971, 1973, 1976, 1992)
 Tampa and Hillsborough County, Florida (1967, 1970, 1972)
 Toledo and Lucas County, Ohio
 Topeka and Shawnee County, Kansas (2005)
 Wilmington and New Hanover County, North Carolina (1933)

Formerly consolidated
 The City of Boston and Suffolk County, Massachusetts operated with a consolidated government for most of the twentieth century with Boston providing office space, auditors, budget, personnel and financial oversight for Suffolk County. This was not a true consolidation because three municipalities – Chelsea, Revere and Winthrop – were never annexed into Boston and remained separate jurisdictions within Suffolk County; however, the City of Boston held complete control of the county by law. The special relationship between Boston and Suffolk County ended in 1999 as part of the gradual abolition of county governments through much of the state with all county employees and powers transferred to Commonwealth of Massachusetts control. The only remaining powers and duties for the City of Boston in regards to the county is ceremonial in which the Suffolk County Register of Deeds is issued the oath of office at the start of a term as well as calls for a meeting to hold a special election to fill the office should there be a failure to elect someone to the office or should a vacancy occur.
From the 17th century to 1898, New York City was coterminous with New York County and was often referred to as the "City and County of New York". Both were coterminous with Manhattan until 1874, when the City and County annexed parts of Westchester County that would later become the West Bronx, later annexing the remainder of the future Bronx. Upon consolidation in 1898, New York County was coterminous and consolidated with the boroughs of the Bronx and Manhattan, while the other boroughs were consolidated with their own respective counties. The Bronx was separated from New York County in 1914 to form its own Bronx County, and since then, each of the five boroughs of New York City is coterminous and consolidated with a county of New York state.

See also

 Combined Statistical Area 
 Conurbation
 City with powiat rights
 City of regional significance
 City-state
 Direct-controlled municipality
 Ekistics
 Independent city (United States)
 Megalopolis (term)
 Megacity
 Merger (politics)
 Metropolitan area
 Metropolis
 Urban secession

References

External links
 Comparative of all city/county consolidations and the issues and advantages each model presents (from the Pittsburgh/Allegheny task force on consolidation)

Webarchive template wayback links
 
County government in the United States
Local government in the United States
Counties